Nossa Senhora do Rosário is a freguesia (civil parish) of Cape Verde. It covers the eastern part of the municipality of Ribeira Grande, on the island of Santo Antão.

Settlements
The freguesia consists of the following settlements (population at the 2010 census):
 Fajã Domingas Benta (pop: 693)
 Lombo Branco (pop: 422)
 Lugar de Guene (pop: 717)
 Monte Joana (pop: 138)
 Pinhão (pop: 751)
 Ribeira Grande (pop: 2,564, city)
 Ribeira Grande rural (pop: 1,112)
 Sinagoga (pop: 603)
 Xoxo (pop: 361)

References

Ribeira Grande Municipality
Parishes of Cape Verde